The African softshell turtle or Nile softshell turtle (Trionyx triunguis) is a large species of turtle from fresh-water and brackish habitats in Africa (larger parts of East, West and Middle Africa) and the Near East (Israel, Lebanon, Syria and Turkey). It is the only extant species from the genus Trionyx, but in the past many other softshell turtles were placed in this genus; they have now been moved to various other genera. Despite the name "African softshell turtle", it is not the only species or genus of softshell turtle in Africa (the genera Cyclanorbis and Cycloderma are also African). It is a very large species of softshell turtle, with sizes that range from 85 to 94 cm, a weight of 40 kg, and an unconfirmed max size of 120 cm. They are omnivores in diet, consuming small fish, crustaceans, and also palm seeds and fallen leaves.

Trionyx triunguis was listed on Appendix II by CITES in 2016; the population in Ghana was also included in CITES Appendix III from 1976 to 2007. The Mediterranean subpopulation of the Nile soft-shelled turtle was listed in the “Red List of Threatened Species” by the IUCN as critically endangered. They are under threat because of large use of their habitats with fishing activities, and irrigation, destruction of their nesting places, destruction caused by boats, and water pollution.

Gallery

References

Further reading
 van Dijk, P.P., Diagne, T., Luiselli, L., Baker, P.J., Turkozan, O. & Taskavak, E. 2017. Trionyxtriunguis. The IUCN Red List of Threatened Species 2017: e.T62256A96894956

External links

T
Reptiles described in 1775